Darius D'Silva (born 16 April 1998) is a cricketer who played for the United Arab Emirates national cricket team. He made his international debut for the United Arab Emirates in August 2019. He lives in Perth, Australia, and has represented the Western Australia cricket team at the under-19 level.

In July 2019, he was named in the United Arab Emirates' squad for their Twenty20 International (T20I) series against the Netherlands. He made his T20I debut for the United Arab Emirates against the Netherlands on 3 August 2019. In October 2019, he was added to the United Arab Emirates' squad for the 2019 ICC T20 World Cup Qualifier tournament in the UAE. In December 2019, he was named in the One Day International (ODI) squad for the 2019 United Arab Emirates Tri-Nation Series. He made his ODI debut for the UAE, against the United States on 8 December 2019.

References

External links
 

1998 births
Living people
Emirati cricketers
United Arab Emirates One Day International cricketers
United Arab Emirates Twenty20 International cricketers
Australian cricketers
Cricketers from Perth, Western Australia
Australian expatriate sportspeople in the United Arab Emirates